The following lists events that happened during 1991 in Chile.

Incumbents
President of Chile: Patricio Aylwin

Events

February
 February – The Rettig Report is released.

November
 November 29 & 30 – The 10th Chilean telethon takes place.

Sport

 Chile at the 1991 Pan American Games
 1991 Copa América
 1991 Copa Chile
 1991 Copa Libertadores Finals
 1991 Intercontinental Cup
 Chile national football team 1991

Births
26 March  Cristian Magaña
8 May – Matías Blásquez
8 June – Felipe Araya

Deaths
9 June – Claudio Arrau, pianist (b. 1903)
11 June – Julieta Campusano (b. 1918)

References 

 
Years of the 20th century in Chile
Chile